Lover Boy is an Italian sex comedy directed by Marino Girolami.

Plot
Pino Persichetti (Enrico Simonetti) is a well-off engineer living in Pisa. He receives the news that his father who had emigrated to Venezuela years ago is now deceased and his widow is planning to visit Pisa and meet the family. Persichetti's adolescent son Carletto (Fioravanti) meets his "grandma" at the airport and while expecting an old woman, he sees that his late grandfather's wife Marianna (Fenech) is a very attractive young woman. He has an instant crush on Marianna but this will lead inexperienced Carletto to a concealed competition with other men interested in her, particularly his father and his older brother Giorgio (Fabrizio Cardinali).

Cast
Giusva Fioravanti: Carletto Persichetti
Edwige Fenech: Marianna
Enrico Simonetti: Pino Persichetti
Gianfranco D'Angelo: Friar Domenico
Valeria Fabrizi: Celeste
Fabrizio Cardinali: Giorgio Persichetti
Graziella Mossini: Marinella

Reception
From a contemporary review, John Pym reviewed the film in a dubbed 78 minute version. Pym stated the film was a "barely functional Italian sex comedy" and that "Patrons of this hackneyed fare may be disappointed to find that an older and larger stand-in substitutes for Carletto in his big scene."

References

Sources

External links

1970s sex comedy films
Commedia sexy all'italiana
Films directed by Marino Girolami
Films set in Pisa
1970s Italian-language films
1970s Italian films